La Düsseldorf is the first album of the band La Düsseldorf.

History
Striking up a stylistic compromise with Michael Rother, the other half of Neu!, Klaus Dinger had recruited his brother Thomas and friend Hans Lampe to play on side two of Neu! '75, taking the band in a more rocking direction than the ambient-inclined Rother cared for. With the split up of Neu! after Neu! '75's release, the remaining members recorded this LP with Neu!/Kraftwerk producer Conny Plank. The result is an album reminiscent of Neu!'s characteristic motorik beat set under atmospheric swathes of keyboard and guitar, but with more emphasis on vocals than the mostly instrumental Neu! had made room for.
"In La Düsseldorf’s eponymous debut, Dinger poked his head into disco and punk and opened himself in ways previously unheard in the more art-focused Neu!."

Track listing

Personnel
La Düsseldorf
Klaus Dinger – guitar, vocals
Thomas Dinger – lighting, percussion, vocals
Harald Konietzko – bass
Hans Lampe – electronics, keyboards, percussion, synthesizer
Nikolaus VanRhein – keyboards, synthesizer
Technical 
Klaus Becker – Proof Reading
Dinger Brothers – Artwork, Stylist
Gary Hobish – Reissue Mastering, Remastering
Stephen Iliffe – Liner Notes
Konrad Plank –	Audio Engineer, Audio Production, Engineer, Producer
Nathaniel Russell – Reissue Design, Reissue Layout
Filippo Salvadori – Reissue Producer

References

1976 debut albums
Albums produced by Conny Plank
La Düsseldorf albums
Radar Records albums